Västertorp (Westcroft) is a district of the Hägersten-Liljeholmen borough in Söderort, the southern suburban part of Stockholm, Sweden.

History
The district was formed on February 1, 1948. The suburb was constructed between 1949 and 1954. The  city plan was established by the city planning director Sven Markelius (1889-1972).

In the center of Västertorp, the 11-storey high-rise center, nursing homes and old-age homes were erected in the late 1950s after drawings by architect Nils Sterner (1904-1990).
Västertorp metro station was opened in 1964. 
Västertorp School was designed in 1949 by architect Stig Åkermark (1903-1995) and was inaugurated in 1951. 
Västertorp  gymnasium was designed by architect Curt Laudon (1906-1964). It was in use as a high school during the years 1957–1984. 
In 2007, the former school premises were converted into housing.

Västertorp Sculpture Park (Västertorps skulpturpark) is a collection of 21 outdoor sculptures.
The park is recognized for the many sculptures decorating the area. Most of the sculptures were erected during the 1950s and are made by Swedish sculptors. Art represented includes  work by sculptors Stig Blomberg (1901-1970), Eric Grate (1896-1983) and Ivar Johnsson (1885-1970).

The sculptures were placed on the initiative of Fritz Herman Eriksson (1889-1970), director of land developer Olsson & Rosenlunds AB.

Västertorp Sculpture Park

References

Districts of Stockholm